Carlos Dickinson or Charles Dickinson was an Argentine footballer, who played as midfielder in Belgrano Athletic Club and the Argentina national football team. Dickinson won seven titles with Belgrano.

Career 
Dickinson was born in Buenos Aires, son of a family of British origin. He began his career Belgrano, club where he won the championships of 1899, 1904 and 1908.

Charles Dickinson participated in the first official match of Argentina team against the Uruguay, marking the first goal of the victory of the Argentina team by 6–0.

Titles 
Belgrano Athletic Club
 Primera División (4): 1899, 1900, 1904, 1908
 Copa de Honor Municipalidad de Buenos Aires (1): 1907
 Tie Cup (1): 1900
 Copa de Honor Cousenier (1): 1907

References 

Argentine footballers
Footballers from Buenos Aires
Argentine people of English descent
Argentina international footballers
Association football midfielders
Belgrano Athletic Club
1870s births
20th-century deaths
Year of birth uncertain
Year of death unknown